Bobby Moore (1941–1993) was an English footballer.

Bobby Moore may also refer to:

Sports
Bobby Moore (pitcher) (1958–2015), former Major League Baseball pitcher for the San Francisco Giants
Bobby Moore (outfielder) (born 1965), former Major League Baseball outfielder for the Kansas City Royals
Bobby Moore (motorcyclist), former world champion motocross racer
Bobby Moore or Ahmad Rashad (born 1949), American former football player

Others
Bobby Moore & the Rhythm Aces (1930–2006), 1960s R&B group
Statue of Bobby Moore, Wembley, a 2007 statue of the footballer outside Wembley Stadium, London
Bobby James Moore: American murderer and the subject of Moore v. Texas (2017), to determine if he had a mental disability that would disqualify him from receiving the death penalty

See also
Robert Moore (disambiguation)
Bob Moore (disambiguation)